Overpelt (literally Upper Pelt) is a town in the municipality of Pelt and a former municipality located in the Belgian province of Limburg. In 2018, the municipality of Overpelt had a total population of 15,478.

The municipality consisted of the following population centres: centre, Holheide, Overpelt-Fabriek, and Lindelhoeven.

Three hospitals are in Overpelt. In 2005, the St. Mary hospital opened as a merger of hospitals in Lommel and Neerpelt. In addition there is the MS-clinic and a center for disabled, Sainte-Ode.

Effective 1 January 2019, Neerpelt and Overpelt were merged into the new municipality of Pelt.

References

External links
 
Official website - Available only in Dutch

Pelt
Former municipalities of Limburg (Belgium)
Populated places in Limburg (Belgium)